Richard Kearney (born 1954) is an Irish philosopher and public intellectual specializing in contemporary continental philosophy. He is the Charles Seelig Professor in Philosophy at Boston College and has taught at University College Dublin, the Sorbonne, the University of Nice, and the Australian Catholic University. He is the author of 23 books on European philosophy and literature (including two novels and a volume of poetry) and has edited or co-edited over 20 more. He was formerly a member of the Arts Council of Ireland, the Higher Education Authority of Ireland and chairman of the Irish School of Film at University College Dublin. He is also a member of the Royal Irish Academy. As a public intellectual in Ireland, he was involved in drafting a number of proposals for a Northern Irish peace agreement (1983, 1993, 1995). He has presented five series on culture and philosophy for Irish and British television and broadcast extensively on the European media. He is currently international director of the Guestbook Project.

Biography
Kearney studied at Glenstal Abbey under the Benedictines until 1972 and graduated with a B.A. in 1975 from  University College Dublin. With fellow students he launched the "Crane Bag" journal. He completed an M.A. at McGill University with Canadian philosopher Charles Taylor in 1976 and held a Masters Travelling Studentship, National University of Ireland, in 1977. He then completed his Ph.D. with Paul Ricœur at University of Paris X: Nanterre. He corresponded with Jean-Paul Sartre, Jacques Derrida and other French philosophers of the era. He was also active in the Irish, British, and French media as a host for various television and radio programs on literary and philosophical themes. His work focuses on the philosophy of the narrative imagination, hermeneutics and phenomenology. Notable academic posts include University College of Dublin (1988-2001), The Film School, UCD (1993-2005), the Sorbonne, University of Paris (1995), and Boston College (1999 – present).

Richard Kearney currently lives in Boston, Massachusetts, where he is married to Anne Bernard and has two daughters, Simone and Sarah.

Work

Among Kearney's best-known written works are The Wake of the Imagination (Routledge, 1998), Poetics of Imagining (Fordham, 1998), On Stories (Routledge, 2002; translated into Dutch and Chinese), Strangers, Gods and Monsters: Interpreting Otherness (Routledge, 2003; translated into Greek and Korean), Debates in Continental Philosophy (Fordham, 2004), Modern Movements in European Philosophy (Manchester University Press, 1984), and Anatheism: Returning to God after God (Columbia, 2011; revised editions published in French and Italian).

Kearney's work attempts to steer "a middle path between Romantic hermeneutics (Schleiermacher) which retrieve and reappropriate God as presence and radical hermeneutics (Derrida, Caputo) which elevates alterity to the status of undecidable sublimity." He calls his approach "diacritical hermeneutics."

See also
Continental philosophy
Postmodern Christianity

References

External links
Twinsome Minds
Guestbook Project

Living people
Boston College faculty
Academic staff of the University of Paris
Academic staff of Côte d'Azur University
University of Paris alumni
Members of the Royal Irish Academy
Postnationalism
Catholic philosophers
1954 births
Irish philosophers